The , also translated loosely as “commander-in-chief of the defense of the north”, was a military post in classical and feudal Japan. Under the command of the seii taishōgun, the chinjufu shōgun was primarily responsible for the pacification of the Ezo people of northern Honshū and Hokkaidō, and Japan's defense against them.

The post was originally created during the Nara period. A military district, called  was established as the chinjufu shōgun's area of authority. It was originally located in the fortress of Tagajō in what is now Miyagi Prefecture. However, it was moved further north in 801, after the chinjufu shōgun at the time, Sakanoue no Tamuramaro achieved a series of victories against the natives, pushing them further north. Once all of Honshū was conquered, or pacified, by the Japanese, the new base at Isawa came to be controlled by the various samurai clans of that region. The castle, along with the chinjufu military district and the position of chinjufu shōgun, was abandoned in the early 14th century.

Notable chinjufu shōgun

See also
 Frederic, Louis (2002). "Japan Encyclopedia." Cambridge, Massachusetts: Harvard University Press.
 "Chinjufu" was also the name of a naval station (depot), an admiralty port. During the Meiji era, of the naval bases at Sasebo, Maizuru, and Yokosuka.
 "Chinju" or "chinju no kami" - a local (tutelary) deity, a guardian god, a tutelary god protecting a specific geographical area. "Chinju no kami" are found in imperial residences, large mansions, Buddhist temples, and in the territories and castles of aristocratic families. They have come gradually to be worshipped as "ujigami" or "ubusuna no kami"

References
 Shin-meikai-kokugo-jiten, Sanseido Co., Ltd, Tokyo 1974

Bibliography 
 Adolphson, Mikael; Edward Kamens, Stacie Matsumoto (2007). Heian Japan: Centers and Peripheries. University of Hawaii Press. .

Shōguns